Salinarimonas rosea is a Gram-negative, catalase- and oxidase-positive rod-shaped, halotolerant, motile bacteria from the genus of Salinarimonas which was isolated from sediment of a salt mine in Yunnan in the south-west of China.

References

External links
Type strain of Salinarimonas rosea at BacDive -  the Bacterial Diversity Metadatabase

 

Hyphomicrobiales
Bacteria described in 2010